Walter Ronald Harris (10 June 1919 – 7 June 2001) was an Australian rules footballer who played with Footscray in the Victorian Football League (VFL).

Notes

External links 

1919 births
2001 deaths
Australian rules footballers from Victoria (Australia)
Western Bulldogs players